Ganga Bahadur Tamang Dong is a Nepali politician and a member of the House of Representatives of the federal parliament of Nepal. He was elected from Kavre-1 constituency, representing Communist Party of Nepal (Maoist Center) of the left alliance, under the first-past-the-post system. He defeated his nearest rival, Tirtha Bahadur Lama of Nepali Congress securing 43,631 votes against Lama's 39,605. Prior to that, he had only contested one local level election and lost.

He is a member of the parliamentary Public Account Committee.

During the Nepalese civil war, he was a member of the maoist party's Tamang Republican Autonomous Region People's Council. He was also a leader of the Tamang National Liberation Front, the Tamang nationalist wing of the maoist party, during the war.

References

Living people
Nepal MPs 2017–2022
Nepal Communist Party (NCP) politicians
People of the Nepalese Civil War
Tamang people
Communist Party of Nepal (Maoist Centre) politicians
1970 births